Peter Rowley (sometimes credited as Harrison Rowley during his early career) (born April 29, 1952) is a New Zealand comic actor and writer. He is best known for his television roles, where he has played in numerous popular television series as comic foil and straight man to comedians such as Billy T. James, David McPhail and Jon Gadsby.

Rowley started his comedy career in New Zealand. He made his New Zealand television debut as an actor and writer in the satirical sketch show A Week of It, following which he continued to work with that show's stars David McPhail and Jon Gadsby in McPhail and Gadsby and  Letter to Blanchy. He also worked with Billy T. James in The Billy T James Show, for which he also wrote material. He received title billing in the series Pete and Pio (1994) alongside fellow comedian Pio Terei. In 2010, Rowley wrote and presented a tribute to the late Billy T. James, entitled Billy T. and Me.

Rowley has also worked in feature films, most notably as the voice actor for the titular Dog in Footrot Flats: The Dog's Tale. His voice acting credentials also include work on the television series Power Rangers Ninja Storm, voicing the character Zurgane.

Filmography
The Stranger (1964) as Jeffrey Mason
Fatty Finn (1980) as Chauffeur
Prisoners (1981) as Hapstood
A Dangerous Summer (1982) as Immigration Officer
Savage Islands (1983) as Louis Beck
Trespasses (1984) as Andy McIntire
Second Time Lucky (1984) as Technician 2
Pallet on the Floor (1984) as Henderson
Came a Hot Friday (1985) as Bar Man
Footrot Flats: The Dog's Tale (1986) as Dog (voice)
Those Dear Departed (1987) as Prophet
Never Say Die (1988) as Armed Police Leader
The Climb (1997) as Rules Rhodes
Cupid's Prey (2003) as Policeman
Power Rangers Ninja Storm (2003, TV Series) as Zurgane (voice)
Power Rangers Dino Thunder (2004, TV Series) as Zurgane (voice)
Perfect Creature (2006) as Man In The Street
Ozzie (2006) as Buzz Maroni
Russian Snark (2010) as Neville
Netherwood (2011) as Carl
I Am Evangeline (2015) as The Weeping Man
Mortal Engines (2017) as Orme Wreyland

References

 

New Zealand male comedians
New Zealand male voice actors
Living people
1952 births